Huntingdon was a federal electoral district in Quebec, Canada, that was represented in the House of Commons of Canada from 1867 to 1917.

It was created by the British North America Act, 1867. It was amalgamated into the Châteauguay—Huntingdon electoral district in 1914.

Members of Parliament
This riding elected the following Members of Parliament:

Election results

See also 
 List of Canadian federal electoral districts
 Past Canadian electoral districts

External links
Riding history from the Library of Parliament

Former federal electoral districts of Quebec